SM U-9 was a German Type U 9 U-boat. She was one of 329 submarines serving in the Imperial German Navy, and engaged in commerce raiding (Handelskrieg) during World War I.

Construction
Her construction was ordered on 15 July 1908 and her keel was laid down by Kaiserliche Werft in Danzig. She was launched on 22 February 1910 and commissioned on 18 April 1910.

Design
The boat displaced  when surfaced and  when submerged.

The U-boat was armed with four  torpedo tubes, two fitted in the bow and two in the stern, and carried 6 torpedoes. Originally, the boat was equipped with a machine gun, which was augmented with a  Hotchkiss gun when war broke out in 1914. In 1915, an additional  gun was fitted. When U-9 underwent a major refit in 1916, two mine-laying rails were added, which were later removed again. The boat's complement was 4 officers and 31 enlisted.

Service history

On 16 July 1914, the crew of U-9 reloaded her torpedo tubes while submerged, the first time any submarine had succeeded in doing so. On 1 August 1914, Kapitänleutnant Otto Weddigen took command. She fired four of her torpedoes, reloading while submerged, and sank all three in less than an hour. 1,459 British sailors died. It was one of the most notable submarine actions of all time. Members of the Admiralty who had considered submarines mere toys no longer expressed that opinion after this event.

On 15 October, U-9 sank the protected cruiser .
On 12 January 1915, Johannes Spieß relieved Weddigen, and commanded U-9 until 19 April 1916. During this period, she sank 13 ships totalling : 10 small fishing vessels and three British steamers (Don, Queen Wilhelmina and Serbino).

After April 1916, she was withdrawn from front-line duties to be used for training.

U-9 and the raider  were the only ships which Kaiser Wilhelm II awarded the Iron Cross.

Summary of raiding history

Notes

References

Bibliography

 Fitzsimons, Bernard, ed. The Illustrated Encyclopedia of 20th Century Weapons and Warfare, "U-Boats (1905–18), Volume 23, p. 2534. London: Phoebus Publishing, 1978.
*

External links
Photos of cruises of German submarine U-54 in 1916–1918.
A 44 min. German film from 1917 about a cruise of the German submarine U-35.
Room 40:  original documents, photos and maps about World War I German submarine warfare and British Room 40 Intelligence from The National Archives, Kew, Richmond, UK.
 

Type U 9 submarines
U-boats commissioned in 1910
World War I submarines of Germany
1910 ships
Ships built in Danzig
Recipients of the Iron Cross (1914)